The list of ship launches in 1938 includes a chronological list of some ships launched in 1938.

References

Sources

1938
Ship launches